Panhandle–Plains Historical Museum is a history museum located on the campus of West Texas A&M University in Canyon, Texas, U.S.A., a small city south of Amarillo. The museum's contents are owned and controlled by the Panhandle-Plains Historical Society, while West Texas A&M University and the Texas A&M University Board of Regents maintains and provides the facilities. Panhandle–Plains Historical Museum is the largest history museum in the state of Texas with 70,000 visitors annually and more than three million artifacts.

The museum's permanent exhibits include American Western life and agriculture history artifacts, art, paleontology, geology, Native American art and artifacts, firearms, antique vehicles, decorative arts and furniture, petroleum industry artifacts, sports artifacts, and textiles. The museum also features the outdoor Pioneer Town that includes a livery, saloon, schoolhouse, pioneer cabin and other buildings.

The Panhandle-Plains Historical Society was founded in 1921 by faculty and students of West Texas State Teachers College and area supporters to preserve the history of pioneer life and natural history in the West Texas region. The museum received financial assistance from the Commission of Control for the 1936 Texas Centennial. The museum opened its permanent and present location on April 14, 1933.

Timothy Dwight Hobart of Pampa, a well-known land surveyor originally from Vermont, was elected president of the society in 1927 and served for six years. He pushed for completion of the museum. In 1933, he became an honorary board member for life.

The noted historian Angie Debo served as curator of the museum from 1933 to 1934.

In 2001, the museum underwent a $5.8 million renovation.

Some of the permanent exhibits include "People of the Plains: Experiments in Living", displays the difference and similarities of past and present Southern Plains settlers; "Pioneer Town", a recreation of a small settlement in the Texas Panhandle in the early 1900s; "The Don D. Harrington Petroleum Wing", a two floor exhibit showing the Texas Panhandle's oil boom years in the 1920s and 1930s; and "The T-Anchor Ranch House", an exhibit outside of the museum which recreates the original house that was constructed in the late 1870s.

From 1951 until his death in 1963, Western artist Harold Dow Bugbee was curator of the museum. In 1990, the museum opened a replica of Bugbee's art studio. On the death of Olive Vandruff Bugbee in 2003, the museum inherited the couple's $1 million estate. The museum also houses much of the western art collection of Frank Reaugh (1860–1945), who stressed pastoral harmony in nature in his paintings.

Texas State Senator Grady Hazlewood of Amarillo, who served from 1941–1971, helped to procure state funding of the museum and contributed $20,000 of his own money for the establishment of the archives section, which houses his own papers.

Gallery

See also
Recorded Texas Historic Landmarks in Randall County

References 

.

External links 
 
The Harringtons
Virtual tour of the Panhandle–Plains Historical Museum provided by Google Arts & Culture

History museums in Texas
Museums in Randall County, Texas
Art museums and galleries in Texas
American West museums in Texas
University museums in Texas
West Texas A&M University
Museums established in 1921
1921 establishments in Texas